Manambaho is a river in Melaky, western Madagascar.

It flows down from central Madagascar into the Mozambique Channel and the Indian Ocean.
It's springs are near Tsiroanomandidy, it passes near Morafenobe and it empties south of Tambohorano and north of Maintirano.

References

External links
 Pictures of the Manambaho river at Morafenobe

Rivers of Madagascar
Rivers of Melaky